The Foster Museum is a private non-profit single-artist museum located in Palo Alto, California, United States dedicated to the  watercolor wilderness Journeys of artist-explorer Tony Foster (1946–). It houses the permanent collection of the Foster Art & Wilderness Foundation and opened to the public in 2016, offering free admission by appointment.

History 
Formerly the ambulance storage facility for Lucille Packard Children's Hospital at Stanford until 2014, the 14,000 square foot building was then redeveloped to house The Foster Museum. This project was awarded LEED silver certification from the USGBC. The museum opened in 2016 to unite and share complete Tony Foster Journeys, and inspire connection to both Foster's art and the natural world.

Exhibitions 
The Foster Museum Orientation, (February 2016 – current) 
Exploring Beauty: Watercolour Diaries from the Wild, (January 2017 – current)
Sacred Places: Watercolour Diaries from the American Southwest, (February 2016 – current)
Retrospective Exhibition: The Art of Tony Foster, (February 2016 – current)

Archives  
The museum maintains and collects the archives surrounding Tony Foster's watercolor wilderness Journeys.

See also 
 List of single-artist museums

References

External links 
Official website

Museums in the San Francisco Bay Area
Art museums and galleries in California
Arts centers in California
Tourist attractions in Santa Clara County, California
Non-profit organizations based in Palo Alto, California
Art in the San Francisco Bay Area
Buildings and structures in Palo Alto, California
2016 establishments in California
Art museums established in 2016